Southbound is an adjective meaning movement towards the south.

Southbound may also refer to:
 Southbound (festival), Australian music festival
 Southbound (publisher), Malaysian publishing house based in Penang
 Southbound interface, concept in client-server architecture
 Southbound (magazine), a travel magazine published by Atlanta magazine

Films
 Southbound (2007 film), 2007 Japanese film starring Etsushi Toyokawa
 Southbound (2015 film), 2015 American anthology horror thriller film

Music
 Southbound (Doc Watson album)
 Southbound (The Doobie Brothers album)
 Southbound (Hoyt Axton album)
 "Southbound" (Mac McAnally song), from Mac McAnally's album Simple Life; also recorded by Sammy Kershaw on Feelin' Good Train
 "Southbound", song by the Allman Brothers Band from Brothers and Sisters
 "Southbound", song by Thin Lizzy from their 1977 album Bad Reputation
 Southbound Records, record label of Ace Records
"Southbound" (Carrie Underwood song), from the album Cry Pretty

See also
Westbound (disambiguation)